Awkward Hands is a 1970 Spanish western film directed by Rafael Romero Marchent, written by Santiago Moncada and Joaquín Romero Hernández, and starring Peter Lee Lawrence, Alberto de Mendoza and Pilar Velázquez.

Cast

References

External links
 

1970 Western (genre) films
1970 films
Spanish Western (genre) films
Films directed by Rafael Romero Marchent
Films produced by Ricardo Sanz
Films with screenplays by Joaquín Luis Romero Marchent
Films scored by Antón García Abril
Films shot in Madrid
Films shot in Almería
1970s Spanish films